Klaus Kalb (born 1942) is a German lichenologist and an authority on tropical lichens.

Biography
 

Klaus Kalb was born in Nuremberg in 1942 and grew up in southern Bavaria. From 1960 to 1965 he studied biology, chemistry, and geography at the University of Erlangen–Nuremberg. Kalb was greatly interested in lichens and decided to pursue a doctoral degree; his thesis work was about lichen communities in the Ötztal Alps. From 1978–1981 he was a teacher at the Colégio Visconde de Porto Seguro in São Paulo, Brazil. This position afforded him the opportunity to initiate research into tropical lichens. Kalb earned his habilitation from the University of Regensburg in 1989, becoming an associate professor with that institution.

In 2014, the University of Wisconsin herbarium purchased Kalb's lichen collection of 60,000 specimens for $75,000. With the acquisition of Kalb's collection, rich in tropical and European specimens, the herbarium houses about 70% of the world's known lichen taxa.

Recognition

In 2007, on the occasion of his retirement, Kalb was honoured with a Festschrift, featuring 24 scientific papers written by 51 authors. The Festschrift included a publication list, a list of taxa described by him and of taxa named after him.

Eponyms

Three lichen genera have been named in honour of Kalb: Kalbiana ; Kalbographa ; and Kalbionora .

Many species have also been named to honour Kalb. These include: Acanthothecis kalbii ; Acanthotrema kalbii ;  Astrochapsa kalbii ; Byssoloma kalbii  Caloplaca kalbiorum ; Chaenothecopsis kalbii   Chapsa kalbii ; Cladina kalbii ; Coenogonium kalbii ; Compsocladium kalbii ; Enterographa kalbii ; Gyalideopsis kalbii ; Heterodermia kalbii ;  Hypotrachyna kalbii ; Hypotrachyna klauskalbii ;  Lecanora kalbiana ; Lecanora klauskalbii ; Lecidea kalbii ; Leptogium kalbii ; Megalospora kalbii ; Musaespora kalbii ; Ocellularia kalbii ; Opegrapha blakii ; Opegrapha kalbii ; Pertusaria kalbii ;  Phaeographis kalbii ; Phyllopsora kalbii ; Physcia kalbii ; Piccolia kalbii ; Pseudocyphellaria kalbi ; Pseudoparmelia kalbiana ;  Rinodina kalbii ; Roselliniella kalbii ; Trichothelium kalbii ; Usnea kalbiana ; Xanthoparmelia kalbii ;  Xanthoparmelia klauskalbii ; Xanthoparmelia neokalbii ; and Lecanora kalbii .

Selected publications 
As of 2012, Kalb had about 120 scientific publications, particularly on tropical lichens. Some of his major works include:

See also
 :Category:Taxa named by Klaus Kalb

References

1942 births
Living people
German lichenologists
German taxonomists
Scientists from Nuremberg
20th-century German scientists
21st-century German scientists
University of Erlangen-Nuremberg alumni
Academic staff of the University of Regensburg